Petra Cetkovská and Michaëlla Krajicek were the defending champions, but both chose not to participate.

Alizé Cornet and Virginie Razzano won the title defeating Akgul Amanmuradova and  Casey Dellacqua in the final 6–2, 6–3.

Seeds

Draw

Draw

References
 Main Draw

Sparta Prague Open - Doubles
WTA Prague Open